The following is a list of unproduced Ridley Scott projects in roughly chronological order. During his long career, English film director and producer Ridley Scott has worked on a number of projects that never progressed beyond the pre-production stage under his direction. Some of these projects fell into development hell or are officially canceled.

1970s

Tristan and Isolde 
In the mid-1970s, before the beginning of the filming of The Duellists, Scott pitched the idea of a film adaptation of medieval romantic legend of Tristan and Iseult, and he planned to release this film as his second movie. However, the project never materialised at the time, and Scott pitched the idea of Legend during the filming of The Duellists as a replacement of this project. The film, Tristan & Isolde, was finally released in 2006 with Kevin Reynolds as the director and with Scott as the producer.

Early developments of an Alien TV series

1980s

Dune 
Around 1981, Scott was hired to direct a film adaptation of Frank Herbert's novel Dune. However, Scott was finally replaced by David Lynch, and the film was released in 1984.

Dudes 
Herb Jaffe and Miguel Tejada-Flores initially hired Scott to direct Randall Jahnson's script for Dudes, but replaced him with Penelope Spheeris due to creative differences.

The Train 
In the late 1980s, Scott wanted to direct Jim Uhls's sci-fi action thriller The Train for Carolco. However, Scott left the project to direct Thelma and Louise and Joel Silver bought the rights and rewritten by Steven E. de Souza and retitled the project as Isobar and The ISOBAR Run. However, it was cancelled due to Carolco's bankruptcy.

Point Break 
Columbia Pictures hired Scott to direct an early version of W. Peter Iliff's screenplay for Point Break under the title Johnny Utah with Charlie Sheen and James Garner starring. The film went into turnaround for several years after Scott quit the film in 1988.

1990s

Crisis in the Hot Zone film 
In February 1994, Scott signed a deal with 20th Century Fox to direct a film adaptation of Richard Preston's article Crisis in the Hot Zone. In late April 1994, Robert Redford and Jodie Foster were in talks for star in the film. However, the project was finally shut down due to many production problems and Foster's departure from it. It was subsequently revived and in 2019, Scott and Lynda Obst developed the National Geographic miniseries.

I Am Legend 
On July 2, 1997, Variety reported that Scott had signed a contract with Warner Bros. to direct the third film adaptation of Richard Matheson's novel I Am Legend. Arnold Schwarzenegger was attached to portray Dr. Robert Neville and Mark Protosevich was attached to write the film, but the project was finally cancelled due to budgetary concerns on March 16, 1998. It was subsequently revived and in 2007 the film was released with Francis Lawrence as director and with Will Smith in the lead role.

2000s

Alien 5 
In an interview on January 23, 2002, Scott expressed his desire to make a fifth installment in the Alien franchise. He stated that the fifth film would explain the Aliens' origins and where they were discovered. James Cameron was attached to return as writer and producer. However, the project was finally shelved by 20th Century Fox since they thought that they would ruin the franchise with a fifth film and due to the production of the spin-off Prometheus, and Alien vs. Predator was released in 2004 instead, as the first installment of the Alien vs. Predator spin-off franchise.

Tripoli film 
On 7 March 2002, Scott was set to direct and produce the historical epic Tripoli with William Monahan writing the script about William Eaton’s march during the First Barbary War. Mark Gordon was attached to produce, while Russell Crowe and Ben Kingsley were cast as Eaton and Hamet Karamanli respectively. The project was shelved so Scott could direct Kingdom of Heaven.

Emma's War 
On 12 June 2003, Ridley Scott was due to produce the adaptation of Deborah Scroggins's novel Emma's War, about aid-worker Emma McCune, with his brother Tony Scott directing, Steven Knight writing the script, and Nicole Kidman set to play McCune. On 16 April 2005, McCune's brother, Johnny, told Kidman to abandon the project because inaccuracies in Scroggins's novel. The film was still in development at the time of Tony Scott's death in 2012; its fate remains unclear who will replace him.

Early development of Gladiator 2 and spin-off

Blood Meridian

Metropolis 
In the 2000s, Scott mooted a sequel to 1982's Blade Runner under the title Metropolis.

Shadow Divers film 
On 21 June 2005, Scott was set to direct and produce the film adaptation of Robert Kurson’s book Shadow Divers with William Broyles writing the script for 20th Century Fox. On 4 August 2010, Scott was replaced by Robert Schwentke as director of Shadow Divers with Simon Kinberg producing, and in November 2010, Mark Bomback will write a new draft of the script under Schwentke’s supervision. However, plans fell into development hell and its fate is unknown after the Acquisition of 21st Century Fox by Disney was completed.

The Killing Sea film 
On 2 May 2006, Ridley and Tony Scott were set to produce the film adaptation of Richard B. Lewis’s novel The Killing Sea for 20th Century Fox. However, plans fell into development hell and its fate is unknown after the Acquisition of 21st Century Fox by Disney was completed.

The Passage film 
Fox 2000 and Ridley Scott's Scott Free Productions purchased the movie rights to Justin Cronin's novel The Passage for US$1.75 million in 2007, long before the book was completed. John Logan, writer of Scott's feature Gladiator, was to write the movie's screenplay. According to Cronin, they were first focusing on one movie, but since he already mapped out the other two books, they knew what was coming next and they planned on three movies. In 2016, Fox gave the pilot production commitment to The Passage from writer/producer Liz Heldens, producer Matt Reeves, Scott Free and 20th Century Fox TV, with Reeves directing the pilot.

Early attempt of The Forever War film

Early development of the Monopoly film

The Kind One film 
In April 2008, Scott was set to direct the movie adaptation of Tom Epperson's crime novel The Kind One, from a screenplay by Epperson and Casey Affleck attached to star as Danny Landon. There has been no further announcements since.

Untitled Alien spin-off 
In late 2008, Sigourney Weaver hinted in an interview with MTV that she and Scott were working on an Alien spin-off film, which would focus on the chronicles of Ellen Ripley rather than on the Aliens, but the continuation of Ripley's story has not materialised.

Purefold 
On June 4, 2009,The New York Times revealed that Scott along with his now-deceased brother Tony Scott were working on a webseries inspired by Blade Runner with episodes of 5 or 10 minutes, that, according to Ridley, it could have also been transmitted on television. In February 2010, it was reported that the production of the series was cancelled due to funding problems.

Brave New World film 
In August 2009, Scott planned to direct an adaptation of Aldous Huxley's Brave New World set in a dystopian London with Leonardo DiCaprio. However, the project has been on hold while Scott has been involved with other projects. The project was revived as the TV series, released in 2020.

2010s

Town House film 
On 26 January 2010, Ridley and Tony Scott's Scott Free banner will produce the adaptation of Tish Cohen's novel Town House with John Carney set to direct from a Doug Wright script with Zach Galifianakis and Amy Adams as the leads. However, plans fell into development hell.

Peony in Love film 
On 22 February 2010, Ridley and Tony Scott's Scott Free banner will produce the adaptation of Lisa See’s novel Peony in Love with Erin Cressida Wilson writing the script for 20th Century Fox. However, plans fell into development hell and its fate is unknown after the Acquisition of 21st Century Fox by Disney was completed.

Robin Hood 2 
On April 4, 2010, Scott revealed his hopes of making a sequel to Robin Hood and more films after that. On May 13, 2010, Russell Crowe expressed his desire to reprise his role as Robin Longstride/Robin Hood. However, plans for the sequel fell into development hell.

Potsdamer Platz film 
On 7 April 2010, Scott will produce Tony Scott directing the crime family drama Potzdamer Platz from a script by Buddy Giovinazzo, David Scinto, and Louis Mellis for 20th Century Fox, with Javier Bardem, Jason Statham and Mickey Rourke in talks to star. However, plans fell into development hell and its fate is unknown after Tony's death and the Acquisition of 21st Century Fox by Disney was completed.

Pompeii miniseries 
On 11 April 2010, Sony Pictures Television, Tandem Communications, and Peace Out bought the rights to the Robert Harris novel Pompeii, with Scott producing, and is looking for a replacement for Roman Polanski. However, the plans fell into development hell.

Ion film 
On 24 June 2010, Scott and Tony Scott will produce the sci-fi, romance, epic Ion from a script by Will Dunn for 20th Century Fox and starring Channing Tatum. However, plans fell into development hell and its fate is unknown after the Acquisition of 21st Century Fox by Disney was completed.

The Wolf of Wall Street film 
In July 2010, Warner Bros. had offered Scott to direct The Wolf of Wall Street, with Leonardo DiCaprio playing the male lead, but Scott eventually abandoned the project and was later replaced by Martin Scorsese.

Archangels film 
On 13 July 2010, New Regency and Ridley and Tony Scott's Scott Free banner will produce Andrew Will's sci-fi action script Archangels with Joseph Kosinski directing and producing. However, plans fell into development hell.

The Color of Lightning film 
On 14 December 2010, Scott was set to direct and produce the film adaptation of Paulette Jiles's The Color of Lightning, from a script by Diana Ossana and James Schamus. However, plans for The Color of Lightning fell into development hell and its fate is unknown after the acquisition of 21st Century Fox by Disney was completed.

Empire of the Summer Moon film 
On 14 December 2010, Scott was set to produce the film adaptation of S. C. Gwynne's book Empire of the Summer Moon with Ossana and Schamus writing the screenplay and Scott Cooper set to direct at Warner Bros. On 31 August 2016, Derek Cianfrance will write and direct Empire of the Summer Moon. There has been no further announcements since for Empire of the Summer Moon.

A Conspiracy of Paper film 
On 16 December 2010, Warner Bros and Scott Free Entertainment will produce the adaptation of David Liss novel A Conspiracy of Paper from a Danny Strong script. However, plans fell into development hell.

Gertrude Bell biopic 
On 30 March 2011, Scott was set to produce and possibly direct a biopic of Gertrude Bell from a Jeffrey Caine script. On 17 November 2011, Angelina Jolie was set to portray Bell, however, plans fell into development hell and its fate is unknown after the Acquisition of 21st Century Fox by Disney was completed.

Fly Me to the Moon film 
On 14 April 2011, Scott was set to produce the film adaptation of Alyson Noel's book Fly Me to the Moon with Sharon Maguire writing and directing the movie. There has been no further announcements since.

Blood Red Road film 
On 12 May 2011, Scott was set to direct a film adaptation of Moira Young's Blood Red Road book from a script by Jack Thorne for the UK division of Scott Free Productions. There has been no further announcements since.

The Last Werewolf film 
On 12 May 2011, Scott was set to produce the film adaptation of Glen Duncan's novel The Last Werewolf through the UK division of Scott Free Productions. There has been no further announcements since.

Red Riding film 
On 13 May 2011, Scott was set to direct a film adaptation of David Peace's Red Riding Quartet series from a script by James Vanderbilt for Columbia Pictures. There has been no further announcements since.

Reykjavík film 
On 17 May 2011, Scott was set to direct and produce the Cold War thriller Reykjavík, from a script by Kevin Hood for Headline Films. On 29 August 2012, Mike Newell will replace Scott as director of Reykjavík with Michael Douglas and Christoph Waltz as Ronald Reagan and Mikhail Gorbachev, respectively. On 13 May 2014, Baltasar Kormákur is set replace Newell as director. However, plans fell into development hell.

Pyrates TV series 
On 24 May 2011, Fox ordered a pilot for Barry Schindel's limited series Pyrates, with Stephen Hopkins directing the pilot and executive-produced by Ridley and Tony Scott, and Ensemble Entertainment, based on the Battle in the Bay of Matanzas. However, the plans fell into development hell.

The Bengali Detective film 
On 17 November 2011, Scott is set to produce Stephen Frears's film The Bengali Detective from a script by D.V. DeVincentis for Fox Searchlight. However, plans fell into development hell.

Untitled Simon Mann biopic 
On 17 November 2011, Scott was set to direct and produce the assassination thriller about Simon Mann’s coup against the president of Equatorial Guinea in 2004. Gerard Butler set to play Mann and Robert Edwards is writing the script. There has been no further announcements since.

The Big Blow 
On 7 February 2012, Scott was set to produce Oren Moverman's The Big Blow, about the boxing match between a ringer named John McBride and Jack Johnson. On 31 May 2018, Reinaldo Marcus Green will replace Moverman as director, but will be credited as screenwriter. Its fate is unknown after MGM and Sylvester Stallone will produce a Jack Johnson biopic.

Silo film series 
On May 11, 2012, the film rights to the story have been sold to 20th Century Fox; director Ridley Scott and Steve Zaillian producing the film adaptation. In July, 2018 AMC took over the project with LaToya Morgan adapting Wool for the network as a series.

The Fishing Fleet film 
On 6 December 2012, Scott Free Productions will produce the film adaptation of Anne de Courcy’s book The Fishing Fleet, with De Courcy acting as development consultant. However, the movie is into development hell.

The Vatican pilot 
On 20 December 2012, Showtime ordered Paul Attanasio's series The Vatican, with a pilot directed by Ridley Scott. The series would be executive-produced by Attanasio, Scott, and David W. Zucker; Kyle Chandler was cast as Cardinal Thomas Duffy, Matthew Goode as Papal Secretary Bernd Koch, Bruno Ganz as Pope Sixtus VI, Anna Friel, Rebecca Ferguson, Sebastian Koch, and Ewen Bremner as the leads. On 12 December 2013, Showtime did not greenlight the series. In January 2014, Showtime president David Nevins said this about the cancellation, "One of the fundamental issues with The Vatican is that the world changed on us. That show was conceived and written while Pope Benedict was still in charge of the Vatican, and it was conceived in a world that now would feel very dated."

Mind MGMT film 
On 29 January 2013, Scott was set to produce the MIND MGMT comic book film, along with Dark Horse Entertainment's Mike Richardson and Keith Goldberg. The comic book's creator, Matt Kindt, acted as a consultant for the film and shared the complete outline for the story with Scott and David James Kelly the screenwriter. He believed Scott had "a good take on it" and did not mind if it was not a faithful adaption. The option was renewed twice to give the screenwriter more time to work. In July 2017, it was announced that Universal Cable Productions would produce a TV series based on the comic, instead of the film; with Daniel Cerone as the showrunner.

Cascade film 
On 26 February 2013, Scott and Steven Zaillian will produce Cascade, a film inspired by The Day Britain Stopped from a Kieran Fitzgerald script. On 3 December 2014, Baltasar Kormákur is set to direct the movie about an oil tanker collision and Cate Blanchett is rumored to be the lead. However, plans fell into development hell and its fate is unknown after the Acquisition of 21st Century Fox by Disney was completed.

Untitled sci-fi short films 
On March 12, 2013, Tubefilter reported that Scott would work with Machinima in the production of twelve science fiction short films. However, on November 21 of that year, Scott reported that the Sci-Fi shorts project was canceled due to the end of the deal.

Fog film 
On 28 March 2013, ScreenDaily reported that Scott would produce with Focus Features International Stephen Fingleton's sci-fi film Fog. However, the movie is into development hell.

Tranquility Base/Earthless film 
On 26 June 2013, Scott was set to produce Daniel Turkewitz's script Tranquility Base for 20th Century Fox, which is described as Lord of the Flies in space. According to IMDb, visual effects artist Paul Franklin will direct the movie under the title Earthless. However, plans fell into development hell and its fate is unknown after the Acquisition of 21st Century Fox by Disney was completed.

The Asset film 
On 4 November 2013, Scott was set to produce Morgan Davis Foehl's script The Asset, about a former Army Ranger who infiltrates a dangerous group of ex-Special Forces soldiers who have revolted against the U.S. government by assassinating confidential informants all over the world for 20th Century Fox. However, plans fell into development hell and its fate is unknown after the Acquisition of 21st Century Fox by Disney was completed.

Concussion film 
On 7 November 2013, Scott's idea of an NFL concussion film was inspired by Dr. Bennet Omalu's study about former NFL stars Junior Seau and Dave Duerson, both of whom committed suicide after suffering from chronic traumatic encephalopathy (CTE). Scott was set to direct after his film Exodus: Gods and Kings, while he and Giannina Facio were looking for an A-list writer. Peter Landesman eventually replaced Scott as director, resulting in the 2015 film.

Fae film 
On 9 December 2013, Scott was set to produce the film adaptation of Jasmine and Colet Abedi's young-adult book series Fae. However, plans fell into development hell and its fate is unknown after the Acquisition of 21st Century Fox by Disney was completed.

Vicious film 
On 17 December 2013, Scott was set to produce the film adaptation of V. E. Schwab's novel Vicious with Story Mining & Supply Co. However, plans fell into development hell.

A Better Place film 
On 27 March 2014, Scott will produce Brad Ingelsby's thriller A Better Place for 20th Century Fox. However, plans fell into development hell and its fate is unknown after the Acquisition of 21st Century Fox by Disney was completed.

Narco Sub film 
On 28 May 2014, Scott joined Simon Kinberg as a producer of Antoine Fuqua's drug trafficking thriller Narco Sub from a script by David Guggenheim for 20th Century Fox, which was originally set to be directed by Tony Scott and Doug Liman. However, the film fell into development hell and its fate is unknown after the acquisition of 21st Century Fox by Disney was completed.

The Devil in the Kitchen film 
On 17 July 2014, Scott, Giannina Facio, and Colet Abedi were set to produce the film adaptation of Marco Pierre White's memoir The Devil in the Kitchen. However, there has been no further announcements since.

Embraced by the Light film 
On 17 September 2014, Scott, Giannina Facio, and Colet Abedi were set to produce the film adaptation of Betty Eadie's book Embraced by the Light. However, there has been no further announcements since.

Timeless film 
On 17 October 2014, Scott will produce the CGI/live-action film adaptation of Armand Baltazar's children's book series Timeless for 20th Century Fox with Baltazar writing the script and Carlos Saldanha directing. However, plans fell into development hell and its fate is unknown after the Acquisition of 21st Century Fox by Disney was completed.

3001: The Final Odyssey miniseries 
On 3 November 2014 it was reported that the U.S. cable channel Syfy had ordered a miniseries adaptation of 3001: The Final Odyssey into production, planned for broadcast in 2015. The miniseries would be executive-produced by Ridley Scott, David W. Zucker and Stuart Beattie; the latter would also be the primary script-writer. The estates of both author Arthur C. Clarke and 2001: A Space Odyssey director Stanley Kubrick were reported as having "offered their full support", but the extent of their involvement was not known at the time. In February 2016, the series was mentioned as one of Syfy's "in development pipeline" projects during their press release for Prototype, though no further announcements have been made since that time.

On Call in Hell film 
On 3 November 2014, Scott will produce the film adaptation of Richard Jadick's memoir On Call in Hell with Andrew Stern writing the script. However, plans fell into development hell.

Neill Blomkamp's Alien 5
In February 2015, director Neill Blomkamp posted concept art on his Instagram feed stating that for years he has been "wanting to make an Alien film". The filmmaker developed the story and artwork after previously working on Chappie with Weaver, who stated that she would reprise her role as Ripley if Blomkamp was directing the project. Later that month, it was confirmed by the studio that Blomkamp would direct a new Alien film starring Weaver. Blomkamp's film would tie directly into the story of Aliens without retconning the other two films in the series. By March 2015, Blomkamp reported that there were plans for more than one Alien project in development. Later that month Michael Biehn, confirmed at Pensacon that he would be reprising his role as Corporal Dwayne Hicks from Aliens. Frequent Blomkamp collaborator Sharlto Copley expressed interest in portraying a Xenomorph, while Bill Paxton also expressed interest in returning to the franchise.

Blomkamp announced that filming would take place sometime during 2017 in Vancouver, British Columbia, while producer Ridley Scott confirmed that production would begin following the completion of Alien: Covenant. Blomkamp released concept art, including a piece featuring an adult-age Newt. The following January, Blomkamp stated that he believed chances for production being greenlit were getting "slim". Scott stated his doubts that the film would ever be made, as his understanding was that there never was a complete script, only a 10-page pitch.

By May 2017, Blomkamp's film was officially cancelled in favor of the third film in Scott's prequel series, which was later also cancelled or postponed. By July 2018, fans of the franchise had started an online petition to produce Blomkamp's cancelled film. In October 2018, Weaver stated that James Cameron wanted it to be produced. In February 2019, Cameron stated that he was working on reviving the project.

Flashman film 
On 4 March 2015, Scott was set to produce a Harry Flashman film through Scott Free as a collaboration with Chernin Entertainment for 20th Century Fox. However, plans fell into development hell and its fate is unknown after the Acquisition of 21st Century Fox by Disney was completed.

Dying to Be Me film 
On 15 April 2015, Scott was set to produce the film adaptation of Anita Moorjani‘s memoir Dying to Be Me through Scott Free as a collaboration with Cara Films. However, plans fell into development hell.

King David film 
On 8 July 2015, Scott was going to produce a King David movie from a script by Jonathan Stokes, as a companion piece to Exodus: Gods and Kings, and it is unknown if Scott would direct. However, the project fell into development hell and its fate is unknown after the Acquisition of 21st Century Fox by Disney was completed.

The Cartel film series 
On 23 July 2015, Scott was set to direct the adaptation of Don Winslow's The Cartel from a Shane Salerno script, and produce The Power of the Dog. However, plans fell into development hell, and Winslow will produce a TV series based on The Cartel series for FX.

The Twisted film 
On 10 September 2015, Scott will produce Olatunde Osunsamni's thriller The Twisted for with Ari Schlossberg writing the script. However, plans fell into development hell.

Planned Alien: Covenant sequel 
On 23 September 2015, Ridley Scott said he was planning two sequels to Prometheus, which would lead into the first Alien film, adding, "Maybe [there will] even [be] a fourth film before we get back into the Alien franchise." In November 2015, Scott confirmed that Alien: Covenant would be the first of three additional films in the Alien prequel series, before linking up with the original Alien and stated that the Prometheus sequels would reveal who created the xenomorph aliens. The screenplay for the third prequel film, called Alien: Awakening, was written during production of Alien: Covenant and was finished in 2017, with production scheduled to begin in 2018. In March 2017, Scott said, "If you really want a franchise, I can keep cranking it for another six. I'm not going to close it down again. No way." In May, Scott announced that Neill Blomkamp's sequel to James Cameron's film Aliens had been cancelled. In a later interview, he said he would have participated as a producer but that 20th Century Fox had decided not to pursue the project.

In an interview, Ridley Scott confirmed the next film sequel will include surviving engineers who were away from their planet while David destroyed its indigenous population. Michael Reyes, writing for Cinema Blend in July 2017, quoted Scott stating that if Sigourney Weaver could reprise her role as Ellen Ripley in the prequels, then "Well, we're heading toward the back end of the first Alien so [using CGI] may be feasible. Ripley's going to be somebody's daughter, obviously. We're coming in from the back end. The time constraints of what's the time between this film, where we leave David going off heading for that colony, I think you're probably two films out from even considering her." According to reports, there will be only one additional prequel film (Alien: Awakening) before a soft reboot is made to the Alien universe, consisting of a new series of films with brand-new and original characters as well as a new setting. In the audio commentary for Alien: Covenant, Scott confirmed that a sequel to Alien: Covenant, tentatively referred to as Alien: Covenant 2, is being written by John Logan, with Fassbender, Waterston, and McBride reprising their roles. Scott also confirmed that the film will cap his prequel series, leading directly into the events of Alien.

By September 2017, chief-executive-officer of 20th Century Fox Stacey Snider, stated that although Alien: Covenant was a financial disappointment, the studio intends to proceed with Ridley's sequel. In late September 2017, screen-graphics designer Carl Braga (aka HumanMedia) announced that the project had been delayed (at best).

Michael Nordine, writing for Indiewire in October 2017, quoted Ridley Scott stating that Alien: Covenant 2 will focus more on the androids and A.I.s as opposed to the xenomorphs. Scott said, "I think the evolution of the Alien himself is nearly over, but what I was trying to do was transcend and move to another story, which would be taken over by A.I.s. The world that the A.I. might create as a leader if he finds himself on a new planet. We have actually quite a big layout for the next one."

In November 2018, Empire magazine announced that the film would take place on LV-426, with the extraterrestrial Engineers being featured in the film and being in pursuit of David following his nefarious actions against Planet 4.

At the 2019 CinemaCon, it was stated that, after its acquisition of 21st Century Fox, Disney "will continue to create new stories" in the Alien series. In May 2019, Variety reported that another prequel was reportedly "in the script phase", with Ridley Scott attached to direct. In September 2020, Scott confirmed that a new Alien film was in development. In August 2021, however, a news report concluded that a sequel is currently uncertain.

Claire film 
On 24 November 2015, Scott will produce Brad Ingelsby's drama Claire. However, plans fell into development hell

The Prisoner film 
In January 2016, Scott was in early negotiations to direct the film version of the 1968 British TV series The Prisoner.

Magic Castle film 
On 11 April 2016, Scott was set to co-produce a Magic Castle film through Scott Free with Radar Pictures from writing duo Andrew Barrer and Gabriel Ferrari. However, plans fell into development hell.

Wraiths of the Broken Land film 
On 10 May 2016, it was announced that Scott would direct the adaptation of Wraiths of the Broken Land with Drew Goddard writing the script and co-producing with Genre Films. However, the project fell into development hell and its fate is unknown after the Acquisition of 21st Century Fox by Disney was completed.

Untitled Andy Weir film 
On 10 May 2016, Scott will co-produce an original Andy Weir screenplay with Genre Films. However, the project fell into development hell and its fate is unknown after the Acquisition of 21st Century Fox by Disney was completed.

The Hunger film 
On 18 August 2016, Scott was set to produce The Hunger, a zombie film directed by his son Luke Scott about the Donner Party from an Alma Katsu script. However, plans fell into development hell and its fate is unknown after the Acquisition of 21st Century Fox by Disney was completed. (This has no connection to his brother Tony's 80's horror film 'The Hunger' starring David Bowie.)

The King of LA film 
On 2 December 2016, Scott was set to produce The King of LA, a crime film directed by Julius Avery from a Chris Bremner script about former actor and DEA agent Darnell Garcia. However, plans fell into development hell.

The Force film 
On 16 March 2017, Scott was set to produce James Mangold's adaptation of Don Winslow's The Force with Scott Frank and David Mamet writing the script. The movie was originally set for a March 2019 release date, but was cancelled due to the Acquisition of 21st Century Fox by Disney.

War Party film 
On 16 March 2017, Scott will produce Andrew Dominik's Netflix film War Party, with Tom Hardy playing a Navy SEAL. There have been no further announcements since.

The Battle of Britain film 
On 3 April 2017, Scott will direct a film about the Battle of Britain from a Matthew Orton script, which is described as a "passion project" for the director. However, the project fell into development hell and its fate was unknown after the Acquisition of 21st Century Fox by Disney was completed. On 9 February 2022, The project was still in development at 20th Century Studios.

Human, Anew film 
On 7 April 2017, Scott will produce Irina Ivanova's sci-fi legal script Human, Anew for 20th Century Fox. However, the project fell into development hell and its fate is unknown after the Acquisition of 21st Century Fox by Disney was completed.

Hello America film 
On 17 May 2017, Scott will produce the film adaptation of J. G. Ballard‘s novel Hello America for Netflix. However, the project fell into development hell.

The Beast Is an Animal film 
On 15 August 2017, it was reported that Scott would produce a film adaptation of the dark fantasy novel The Beast Is an Animal written by Peternelle van Arsdale for Amazon Studios. Bert and Bertie were in negotiations to direct and adapt. No further development was reported.

Neither Confirm Nor Deny film 
On 22 August 2017, Scott was announced to co-produce the film adaptation of David H. Sharp‘s book The CIA's Greatest Covert Operation: Inside the Daring Mission to Recover a Nuclear-Armed Soviet Sub with New Sparta Films entitled Neither Confirm Nor Deny. On June 15, 2018, Variety announced Dave Collard (Out of Time, Annapolis) as the writer of the film. However, the project fell into development hell.

Blade Runner 2049 possible sequel 
In October 2017, Denis Villeneuve said that he expected a third film would be made if 2049 was successful. Hampton Fancher, who wrote both films, said he was considering reviving an old story idea involving Deckard traveling to another country. Ford said that he would be open to returning if he liked the script. In January 2018, Scott stated that he had "another [story] ready to evolve and be developed, [that] there is certainly one to be done for sure", referring to a third Blade Runner film.

Task Force Two film 
On 4 January 2018, Scott is producing with Joshuah Bearman and Joshua Davis of Epic Magazine Jennifer Yee McDevitt's action drama Task Force Two about the California search-and-rescue team for Amazon Studios. However, the movie is into development hell.

Queen & Country film 
On 15 March 2018, Scott took over directing the Oni Press comic book movie Queen & Country from Craig Viveiros. On 19 June 2018, Sylvia Hoeks was rumored to be Tara Chace. However, the film fell into development hell and its fate is unknown after Disney's acquisition of 21st Century Fox was completed.

Amman Mission film 
On 20 March 2018, Scott will produce with Zhejiang Talent Television and Film Co. the action thriller Amman Mission, based on the evacuation of Chinese nationals in 1990 during the Iraqi invasion of Kuwait. However, plans fell into development hell.

The Riders film 
On 8 October 2018, Scott signed on to produce the film adaptation of Tim Winton's novel The Riders with David Kajganich writing the script. There have been no further announcements since.

It's What I Do biopic 
On 24 October 2018, Scott signed on to direct the Lynsey Addario biopic It's What I Do, from Peter Craig's script for Warner Bros. after Steven Spielberg abandoned the project, and wanted Scarlett Johansson to replace Jennifer Lawrence as Addario, until Johansson dropped out the following day after finding out it is funded by the Saudi crown prince, Mohammad bin Salman. There have been no further announcements since.

References 

Unrealised
Scott, Ridley